Piața Sudului (Southern Square) is a metro station in located in Berceni, Bucharest. Located near the station, above ground is the 'Big Berceni' market, highway to Oltenița (Șoseaua Olteniței) and many other transport options including tram, trolleybus and bus connections, run by the STB. The station is directly linked with the Shopping Mall Sun Plaza through underground.

The station was opened on 24 January 1986 as part of the inaugural section of the line, from Piața Unirii to Depoul IMGB.

References

Sudului
Railway stations opened in 1986
1986 establishments in Romania